David Charles Meyers (born October 19, 1972) is an American music video, commercial and film director.

Early life
Born and raised in Berkeley, California, Dave Meyers developed his love for film while working for a local Landmark cinema at age 17. After graduating from Berkeley High School he attended Loyola Marymount University where he studied Film Production and Philosophy.

Career
After graduating from Loyola Marymount University, Meyers worked his way through the studio systems at Paramount and Fox before filming his first music video with rap crew The Whoridas.

Inspired by a chance meeting with director Gus Van Sant, Meyers steered his focus away from feature film-making to directing music videos.  He has directed more than 200 videos for some of the music industry’s most popular recording artists. His work brought dozens of nominations and 12 MTV Video Music Awards including the 2003, 2011, 2017 and 2018 MTV Video Music Award for Best Video of the Year. In 2006, he won the Grammy Award for Best Music Video for co-directing Missy Elliott's "Lose Control".

In 1999, Meyers directed the Eddie Griffin comedy Foolish and in 2007, he directed the remake of The Hitcher, which was produced by director Michael Bay.

Meyers is a frequent collaborator to Janet Jackson, Ariana Grande, Britney Spears, Katy Perry, Missy Elliott, Jay-Z, Snoop Dogg, Jennifer Lopez & Pink.

Filmography

Films

Music videos

Commercials
Adidas – "Born to Perform", "Superstar", "Unstoppable"
Amex – "US Open"
Apple – "Breakdance", "Dance", "Funk", "Hip Hop", "Rock", "Saturday Hip Hop", "Stereo Rock"
AT&T – "Shedding Styles"
Beats by Dre – "Queen of Queens"
Britney Spears – "Curious"
Budweiser – "Traffic Stoppers"
CA Lottery – "Super Ticket"
Chase – "Bank", "Office", "Rockettes"
Chevy – "Campsite", "Diner", "Keeps Going", "Stronger Truck", "Work Gloves"
Chrysler – "Golf Buddies"
Cingular Wireless – "Alter Ego Guy", "Alter Ego Girl", "Bridge"
Cîroc – "Name Change", "Smile", "Smooth"
Citibank – "Bright Lights"
Coors Light – "Ascent", "Snow Cave"
Deichmann – "Graceland"
Discover America/Brand USA – "Anthem"
Doritos – "Anti-Ad"
ESPN – "Heat Huddle", "Pain", "Suit Up"
Foot Locker – "Snow Dunk"
Frito-Lay – "Favorite Things"
Fujifilm – "Now or never."
Gatorade G2 – "Kevins"
GA Lottery – "Overture"
Gillette – "Face Abuse", "Rehydrate"
GMC – "Blade"
Google Pixelbook – "Go Make, Discover, Ask"
House of Fraser – "Turn It On"
HP – "Gwen Stefani's Say"
Hummer – "Yacht"
ITV – "Launch"
John F. Kennedy Presidential Library and Museum – "Ask Not"
Kmart – "Jimmy & Jenny"
La Poste – "Une journée Extraordinaire"
Lexus – "Make Some Noise"
Lowe's – "Coloring Book", "Don't Stop", "Exploded", "Lights Across America"
Luminary – "Listeners"
Mercedes – "Believe", "Smart Saves the City"
Mexico Tourism – "Chiapas", "Oaxaca"
M&M's – "Kaleidoscope"
New York Lottery – "Beach Party", "Traditions"
National Domestic Violence Hotline – "It Rarely Stops", "Pictures"
Nike – "Chamber of Fear", "Second Coming"
NFL Network – "Hologram Al", "Human Verification", "Space Raiders"
O2 – "Priority"
Olay – "Glam It Up"
Olympus – "Bridesmaids", "Tourists"
Pacific Standard Time – "Ice Cube Celebrates the Eames"
Parlux Fragrances – "Reb'l Fleur"
PETA – "Thanksgiving"
Planters – "Road Trip", "Funeral"
Pringles – "Rave", "Road Trip", "Pool Party"
PSP – "PSPOV"
Reebok – "Layers Off"
Sony Xperia – "Cloud", "Tumbleweed"
Starbucks – "Good Feels Good"
State Farm – "Wake Up"
TAP Project – "Life"
Target – "Do Your Room", "Assortment Anthem"
Twitter – "Music Is Happening", "Summergeddon"
Verizon – "Juke"
Verizon Fios – "Travel Companion"
Virgin Mobile – "Foreign Language", "Killer Comebacks"
Volvo – "Music Video"

Awards

Books 
 Henry Keazor, Thorsten Wübbena: Video Thrills The Radio Star. Musikvideos: Geschichte, Themen, Analysen. Bielefeld 2005, p. 79ss., p. 218ss.

References

External links
 
 David Meyers videography , Mvdbase.com

1972 births
American music video directors
Berkeley High School (Berkeley, California) alumni
Grammy Award winners
Living people
Loyola Marymount University alumni
Artists from Berkeley, California
Film directors from California
Television commercial directors